Stephen Huszar (born January 24, 1984) is a Canadian film and television actor born in Saskatoon. He is first generation Hungarian. His parents came over from Hungary as immigrants when they were very young.
He graduated from the University of Saskatchewan.

Career
Huszar has starred in Christmas themed TV movies for Hallmark Channel, Lifetime (TV network) and Netflix, as well as a recurring role in the Ruby Herring Mysteries. In 2017, Huszar appeared as the DC comic book character Jared Morillo / Plunder in The Flash. Huszar next stars in the horror film Rabid, which is set to be released in select theaters, digitally and On Demand on 13 December 2019.

Filmography

Notes

External links
 

1984 births
Living people
Canadian male film actors
Canadian male television actors